The Papuan white-eye (Zosterops novaeguineae), sometimes known as the New Guinea white-eye, is a species of bird in the family Zosteropidae. It is found in the Aru Islands and New Guinea (mainly Huon, Bird's Head and Papuan Peninsula). Its natural habitats are subtropical or tropical moist lowland forests and subtropical or tropical moist montane forests. The species was first classified in 1878, and has a conservation status of Least Concern.

References

Papuan white-eye
Birds of the Aru Islands
Birds of New Guinea
Papuan white-eye
Taxonomy articles created by Polbot